List of typhoons can refer to:
List of Pacific typhoons
List of Pacific typhoon seasons